Jean A. Crowder (born July 7, 1952) is a Canadian businesswoman and politician. She served as a Member of Parliament for the New Democratic Party from 2004 until 2015.

Life and career
Crowder was born in Montreal, Quebec. She received a degree in psychology from Wilfrid Laurier University in Waterloo, Ontario.

A human resources consultant and manager by profession, Crowder was elected to the House of Commons of Canada for the first time in the 2004 election as the New Democratic Party (NDP) Member of Parliament for Nanaimo—Cowichan, British Columbia. Prior to being elected to federal office, she was a councillor in the District Municipality of North Cowichan from 2003 to 2004.  She has worked at Malaspina University-College, Human Resources Development Canada, and the BC Ministry of Skills Training & Labour.

In the NDP's shadow cabinet, she served as the Human Resources and Skills Development Critic, the Critic for Health, Community Economic Development and the Status of Women, and the Critic for Aboriginal Affairs.

In the 2008 federal election, she defeated nearest rival Reed Elley (Conservative) by over 4,000 votes. After the election, she announced her support for proportional representation to be utilized during Canada's next election. She did not run in the 2015 federal election, at which her riding was abolished and its territory transferred to the new ridings Cowichan—Malahat—Langford and Nanaimo—Ladysmith.

References

External links
Official website
Parliament webpage

1952 births
Living people
Anglophone Quebec people
Members of the House of Commons of Canada from British Columbia
New Democratic Party MPs
People from Duncan, British Columbia
Politicians from Montreal
Wilfrid Laurier University alumni
Women members of the House of Commons of Canada
Women in British Columbia politics
21st-century Canadian politicians
21st-century Canadian women politicians